Gvidas is a Lithuanian masculine given name. The name possibly derives from the ancient Germanic root "widu" or "wido", meaning "forest borderline", or the Latin "vīta", which means "life". Individuals bearing the name Gvidas include:

Gvidas Gineitis (born 2004), Lithuanian footballer
Gvidas Juška (born 1982), Lithuanian footballer
Gvidas Sabeckis (born 1984), Lithuanian tennis player

References

Masculine given names
Lithuanian masculine given names